Budziwój is a district of the city of Rzeszów.  Until 31 December 2009 it was a part of the administrative district of Gmina Tyczyn, within Rzeszów County, Subcarpathian Voivodeship, in south-eastern Poland.

References

Rzeszów
Neighbourhoods in Poland